Jason Adam Dunn (born November 15, 1973) is a former American football tight end and current college football coach. He is currently the special teams coordinator and tight ends coach at Kentucky State University. He was originally drafted by the Philadelphia Eagles in the second round of the 1996 NFL Draft.  He played college football at Eastern Kentucky.

Professional career
After playing for the Eagles for three seasons, Dunn missed the 1999 season due to a knee injury.  He was then signed by the Kansas City Chiefs in July 2000.

Dunn was primarily used as a blocking tight end for the Chiefs; former teammate Tony Gonzalez was the primary receiving tight end.  On February 27, 2008, after spending eight years with the Chiefs, he was released by the team.

Coaching career
In July 2010, Dunn was hired as the offensive line coach at Lafayette High School in Kentucky.  In July 2013, he was hired as the special teams coordinator at Kentucky State University.

References

External links

Kansas City Chiefs bio

1973 births
Living people
People from Harrodsburg, Kentucky
American football tight ends
Eastern Kentucky Colonels football players
Philadelphia Eagles players
Kansas City Chiefs players